IndoWordNet is a linked lexical knowledge base of wordnets of 18 scheduled languages of India, viz., Assamese, Bangla, Bodo, Gujarati, Hindi, Kannada, Kashmiri, Konkani, Malayalam, Meitei (Manipuri), Marathi, Nepali, Odia, Punjabi, Sanskrit, Tamil, Telugu and Urdu.

Dravidian WordNet is a
WordNet for Dravidian Languages.

Background
In early 90s, the wordnet for English- called Princeton WordNet- was created in Princeton University by George Miller and Christiane Fellbaum who went on to get the prestigious Zampoli Prize in 2006. Then followed the EuroWordNet- the conglomeration of European Language wordnets- which got created in 1998. Wordnets are now essential resources for Natural Language Processing, Information Extraction, Word Sense Disambiguation and such other computations involving text.

Importance of Indian languages
Indian languages form a very significant component of the languages landscape of the world. There are 4 streams of language typology operative in the Indian subcontinent- Indo European, Dravidian, Tibeto Burman and Austro Asiatic. Many languages rank within top 10 in the world in terms of the population speaking them, e.g., Hindi-Urdu 5th, Bangla 7th, Marathi 12th and so on as per the List of languages by number of native speakers. Creating wordnets of Indian languages is therefore a highly important techno-scientific and linguistic project.

Genesis of Indian language wordnets
Such project indeed took off in 2000 with Hindi WordNet being created by the Natural Language Processing group at the Center for Indian Language Technology (CFILT) in the Computer Science and Engineering Department at IIT Bombay. It was made publicly available in 2006 under the GNU license. The Hindi WordNet was created with support from the TDIL project of Ministry of Communication and Information Technology, India and also partially from Ministry of Human Resources Development, India.

Wordnets of other languages of India then followed suit. The large nationwide project of building Indian language wordnets was called the IndoWordNet project. IndoWordNet is a linked lexical knowledge base of wordnets of 18 scheduled languages of India, viz., Assamese, Bangla, Bodo, Gujarati, Hindi, Kannada, Kashmiri, Konkani, Malayalam, Meitei, Marathi, Nepali, Oriya, Punjabi, Sanskrit, Tamil, Telugu and Urdu. The wordnets are getting created by using expansion approach from the Hindi WordNet. The Hindi WordNet was created from first principles (mentioned below) and was the first wordnet for an Indian language. The method adopted was the same as the Princeton WordNet for English.

Polish WordNet is being mapped to Princeton WordNet based on the strategy followed by IndoWordNet.

Principles of wordnet construction
The wordnets follow the principles of minimality, coverage and replaceability for the synsets. That means, there should be at least a 'core' set of lexemes in the synset that uniquely give the concept represented by the synset (minimality), e.g., {house, family} standing for the concept of 'family' ("she is from a noble house"). Then the synset should cover ALL the words representing the concept in the language (coverage), e.g., the word 'ménage' will have to appear in the 'family' synset, albeit, towards the end of the synset, since its usage is rare. Finally, the words towards the beginning of the synset should be able to replace one another in reasonable amount of corpora (replaceability), e.g., 'house' and 'family' can replace each other in the sentence "she is from a noble house".

Statistics of Indian language wordnets
The number of synsets (As of August 2014) in the languages and the institutes creating the language WordNets are as below:

Summary
IndoWordNet is highly similar to EuroWordNet. However, the pivot language is Hindi which, of course, is linked to the English WordNet. Also typical Indian language phenomena like complex predicates and causative verbs are captured in IndoWordNet.

IndoWordNet is publicly browsable. The Indian language wordnet building efforts forming the subcomponents of IndoWordNet project are: North East WordNet project, Dravidian WordNet Project and Indradhanush project all of which are funded by the TDIL project.

References

External links 
 

Lexical semantics